Diadegma densepilosellum is a wasp first described by Cameron in 1911.
No subspecies are listed.

References

densepilosellum
Insects described in 1911